The Boundary is a 2014 Chinese suspense action crime drama film directed by Wang Tao. It was released on November 6.

Cast
Liu Ye
Vincent Zhao
Choo Ja-hyun
Guli Nazha
Xue Haowen
Chan Hwi
Marc Ma
Wu Peirou

Reception
By November 7, the film had earned ¥13.10 million at the Chinese box office.

References

Chinese crime drama films
Chinese suspense films